The 1974 Canadian Open was the first edition of the professional invitational snooker tournament, the Canadian Open, which took place in September 1974.

Cliff Thorburn won the title defeating Dennis Taylor 8–6 in the final.

Main draw

References

1974 in snooker
Open
Open